Thomas Welsh may refer to:

Sports
Thomas Welsh (swimmer) (born 1933), British
Thomas Welsh (rower) (born 1977), American
Thomas Welsh (basketball) (born 1996), American

Others
Thomas Welsh (composer) (died 1848), English composer and operatic singer
Thomas Welsh (general) (1824–1863), brigadier general during the American Civil War
Thomas Welsh (bishop) (1921–2009), American Roman Catholic bishop

See also
Thomas Welch (disambiguation)
Thomas Walsh (disambiguation)